St. Joseph's Institution (SJI) is an independent Catholic educational institution in Singapore. Founded in 1852 by the De La Salle Brothers, it is the first Catholic school and the third oldest school in the country.

SJI has been offering a dual-track education comprising the GCE Ordinary Level Programme (OP) and the Integrated Programme (IP) track since 2013. The IP track which leads to the International Baccalaureate Diploma Programme (IBDP), which integrates the four-year secondary education with a two-year IBDP, where IP students can proceed onto the two-year IBDP without the need to complete the O-Level examinations at the end of their fourth year. The OP students will take their O-Level examinations at the end of their fourth year. Based on their O-Level examination results, they can apply to continue the IBDP at SJI, or pursue their studies at other junior colleges or polytechnics.

The school had its first IP intake at Secondary 1 and Secondary 3 in 2013 and 2014 respectively while the first IBDP intake was in 2013.

The school's current principal is Justin Arul Pierre, a former cluster superintendent in the schools division, who assumed principalship in January 2022.

The school's four fraternities, Fintan, Lawrence, Marcian and Michael, are named after Brother Fintan Blake, Brother Lawrence Robless, Brother Marcian James Cullen and Brother Michael Noctor respectively. The school's thirteen blocks, not counting the chapel or the brothers’ quarters, are named after Julian-Nicolas Rèche, Benildus Romançon, Cyril Bertrán, the school's founder Jean-Baptiste de La Salle, Evencio Uyarra, Florencio Martín, Gabriel Drolin, Jaime Hilario Barbal, former principal Kevin Byrne, the school's first principal Liefroy Bajon, Mutien-Marie Wiaux, the Notre Dame de La Star and Salomone Leclercq.

History
St Joseph's Institution (SJI), originally known as St. John's Institution, was founded in 1852 as the first missionary establishment of the De La Salle Brothers in the Far East. This endeavour was initiated by Rev Fr Jean-Marie Beurel MEP, who offered the opportunity to six Brothers from Europe to start the school using a former chapel as premises. Within a year, an attap hut had to be erected to accommodate all the students.

On 19 March 1855 (Feast of Saint Joseph), the cornerstone of a new school building was laid, and from that date, the school came to be known as St. Joseph's Institution. The new central classroom block was completed in 1865, though the further expansion of the facilities continued well into the 20th century. The school had 426 students in 1900. This grew to almost 1200 in 1914, and 1600 in 1922. With the student population expanding, a temporary branch school was opened, which eventually led to the building of a second school – Saint Patrick's School, Singapore – in 1933.

During World War II, prior to the fall of Singapore to the Japanese, the school was used as a Red Cross hospital and housed a unit of the Civil Defence Force, the A.R.F. (Air Raid Precautionary Group). On 16 February 1942, a bomb hit the school courtyard during the war, leaving a crater, but the main building remained unscathed.

During the Japanese occupation of Singapore, the school was renamed to Bras Basah Road Boys' School. The Brothers were asked to 'resign' and the school and hostel were run along military lines. Three weeks after the Japanese surrender, the Brothers returned and St Joseph's was re-opened and normal lessons resumed.

In 1954, St. Joseph's Junior School was housed in St. Michael's School, now known as St. Joseph's Institution Junior (SJIJ).

In 1975, St Joseph's Institution's first-year pre-university classes and some of its teachers were transferred to the newly opened Catholic Junior College.

In 1988, St. Joseph's Institution shifted into a new campus at Malcolm Road situated just off the neighbourhood of Toa Payoh, beside the Tanglin Community Centre. The old campus, with its distinctive semi-circular wings, was gazetted by the Singapore National Heritage Board as a national monument. It now houses the Singapore Art Museum. Under the administration of Brother Paul Anthony Rogers, St Joseph's Institution saw its peak in growth. In 1995, a Performing Arts Centre (PAC) and a new wing to house Secondary One students were added.

In 2002, St. Joseph's Institution celebrated its 150th anniversary.

In 2006, St. Joseph's Institution, upon the urging of the Economic Development Board, began an international school. SJI International (St Joseph's Institution International) began classes in January 2007. The School started with just over 100 students but now boasts more than 1200 students across both its Elementary School and High School. This remarkable success is due to the dedication of the Old Boys and the faith of the parents. St Joseph's Institution International High School offers the IGCSE and the IB Diploma Programme (IBDP), similar to the Senior School of St Joseph's Institution, at Malcolm Road, today.

It was also the first year in which only pure sciences were offered to every candidate.

In 2008, the school was re-validated with the Singapore Quality Class Award, obtained, for the second time, the Best Practice Award (Teaching and Learning) and attained the Best Practice Award (Student All-Round Development) in the MOE External Validation exercise. The school received consecutive Sustained Achievement Awards in Academic Value-Added, Sports, Uniformed Groups and Fitness.

In 2009, St. Joseph's Institution was recognised by the Ministry of Education with a pinnacle award – The School of Excellence Award. The School Excellence Award (SEA) recognises schools for their excellence in both education processes and outcomes.  It is the highest and most prestigious award in the Masterplan of Awards framework in MOE, Singapore.

In 2013, St. Joseph's Institution took in its first intake of Year 5 male and female students under the International Baccalaureate Diploma Programme (IBDP), with an inaugural batch of 80 students admitted. That same year, St Joseph's Institution also had its first intake of secondary 1 male students into its Integrated Programme (IP) which will culminate with the IBDP when they are year 5. St Joseph's Institution also bolstered its academic staff and upgraded its facilities for the IBDP student block to provide the necessary infrastructure and support for the students to develop to their fullest potential.

At the end of 2013, St. Joseph's Institution moved to a holding campus at Bishan Street 14, while the main campus at Malcolm Road was undergoing renovations. On 20 July 2015, works to redevelop the school began, with a new target of moving back by March 2017.

On 9 January 2017, St. Joseph's Institution moved back to their main campus at 38 Malcolm Road, after two years of renovations.

On 22 July 2017, St. Joseph's Institution celebrated its 165th anniversary in Singapore.

St. Joseph's Institution has been a Gold Value Added school for the GCE 'O' Level examinations.

St. Joseph Institution Junior (formerly St. Michael's School) 
St. Michael's School, founded in 1954, was renamed SJI Junior on Jan 1, 2007. Both St. Michael's School and St. Joseph's Institution are run by the Christian Brothers and have strong historical links. SJI used to have a primary school section, named St. Joseph's Junior School, at its Bras Basah campus. The name of the primary school was subsequently changed to St. Michael's School in memory of Brother Michael Noctor, the late Director of SJI.

Affiliated schools 
 Primary schools:
De La Salle School (DLSS)
St. Joseph's Institution Junior (SJIJ), formerly St. Michael's School
 St. Stephen's School (SSS)
 St. Anthony's Primary School (SAPS)
Tertiary institution (non-Lasallian school):
Catholic Junior College (CJC)

The Lasallian Family 
 Primary schools:
De La Salle School (DLSS)
St. Joseph's Institution Junior (SJIJ), formerly St. Michael's School
 St. Stephen's School (SSS)
 St. Anthony's Primary School (SAPS)
 Secondary school:
 St. Patrick's School (SPS)
 International school:
St. Joseph's Institution International (SJII)
Tertiary institution (non-Lasallian school):
Catholic Junior College (CJC)

Uniform
The school uniform is a simple, white collared shirt with the school badge on the pocket. The secondary school boys (Years 1 and 2) wear white shorts and white long pants are worn by the Year 3 and 4 boys. The IBDP boys in Years 5 and 6 wear a white shirt with a green inner collar and the school badge on the pocket with white long pants while the girls wear a white blouse with the school badge on the left hand side and a dark green skirt. The shirt is tucked into the pants

The school tie is worn on the first weekday of school from the start of the school day until 9.30am, and at all formal school functions. The top button is buttoned when the tie is worn.

School prefects and those authorised to wear the school's green blazer with the school's crest are permitted to wear simple, black, leather shoes when they are formally attired.

Co-Curricular Activities

Co-Curricular Activities 
SJI has 3 main group of Co-Curricular Activities, Sports, Uniformed Groups and Clubs & Societies. SJI's niches include Canoeing, Football and Table Tennis.

The St Joseph's Institution Military Band (SJIMB) clinched the Gold with Honours Award under the baton of Mr Tan Thiam Hee in the recent 2009 Singapore Youth Festival Central Judging, the highest achievable award in that competition.  It was one of the top 10 bands in the competition to do so. In the 2011 Singapore Youth Festival Central Judging, the band managed to clinch the Silver award.  The choice piece was the Seventh Night of July and the set piece was the Memories of Friendship.

In the 2011 Singapore Youth Festival Central Judging, the Vocal Ensemble managed to clinch the Gold With Honours award. This was the Vocal Ensemble's inaugural participation in the SYF competition. The choice pieces were Ubi Caritas and Kruhay, while the set piece was The Wind by Kelly Tang.

In the 2015 National School Games, the SJI ‘B’ division Football team managed to come in runner-up. The SJI cross country team also came in runner-up in the 'B' division and 3rd in the 'C' division, the best in its history.

In the 2018 Trinity College London exams, the SJI Guitar Ensemble has broken records and obtained high distinction of 92%, the highest in Singapore that year. After the achievement, the ensemble went on to claim distinction in SYF as well in 2019 April. Notable pieces played - Concerto grosso If You Love Me and Pastoral - Sky, Cloud, Wind.

In the 2021 Singapore Youth Festival Arts Presentation, SJIMB sent two groups to compete under special considerations posed by the ongoing COVID-19 Situation, and both teams achieved Distinction. The choice pieces were "Starlight Wink" and "The Phantom of the Dark Hollow."

In the 2022 National School Games, the SJI ‘C’ division Football team managed to come in overall Champions for South Zone, the best result in the school's history.

Creativity, Activity and Service 
The Creativity, Activity and Service (CAS) is part of the International Baccalaureate Diploma Programme. CAS is to strengthen and extend students’ personal and interpersonal learning. The three strands are defined as follows:

• Creativity - exploring and extending ideas leading to an original or interpretive product or performance.

• Activity - physical exertion contributing to a healthy lifestyle.

• Service - collaborative and reciprocal engagement with the community in response to an authentic need.

Notable alumni

Politics

 Tony Tan, 7th President of Singapore
 Teo Chee Hean, Senior Minister, Coordinating Minister for National Security and Member of Parliament for Pasir Ris-Punggol GRC
 Edwin Tong, Minister for Culture, Community and Youth, Second Minister for Law and Member of Parliament for Marine Parade GRC
 Christopher De Souza, Deputy Speaker of the Parliament and Member of Parliament for Holland-Bukit Timah GRC
 George Yeo, Former Minister for Foreign Affairs
 Mah Bow Tan, Former Minister for National Development
 Charles Chong, Former Member of Parliament
 Matthias Yao, Former Member of Parliament
 Ng Pock Too, Former Member of Parliament
 Tan Chye Cheng, Member of the Legislative Council of Singapore (1948–1955)
 Daniel Goh, Former Non-Constituency Member of Parliament (NCMP)

Governmental organisations

 Gerard Ee, Chairman, Agency for Integrated Care and Chairman, Charity Council (Singapore)
 Philip Yeo, Chairman, SPRING Singapore and former Chairman, A*STAR
 Tan Chorh Chuan, Chief Health Scientist, Ministry of Health (MOH) and Executive Director, Office for Healthcare Transformation, Ministry of Health. Former President, National University of Singapore and former Director, Medical Services, Ministry of Health.

Business

 Ee Peng Liang - Businessman and philanthropist
 Khoo Teck Puat - late Singapore tycoon
 Anthoni Salim - Head of Salim Group

Sports

 Goh Tat Chuan - former national soccer player
 Jacob Mahler - national soccer player
 Rudy Mosbergen - former field hockey olympian and founder of Raffles Junior College
 Tan Eng Yoon - former sprinting olympian

Arts and entertainment

Chong Fah Cheong - Cultural Medallion winner for visual arts (2014)
Dick Lee - musician; Cultural Medallion winner (2004)
 Goh Sin Tub - A pioneer of Singapore literature and a teacher, civil servant, banker, builder, social worker and former chairman of the SJI Board of Governors
 Jeremy Monteiro - jazz pianist; board member, National Arts Council; Cultural Medallion winner (2002)
 Julian Hee - Mediacorp artiste
 Jahan Loh - Contemporary artist
 Anthony Then - dancer and choreographer

Legal

 Chan Seng Onn - Judge of the High Court of Singapore (since July 2007), Former Solicitor-General of Singapore (2001-2007)
 Davinder Singh, S.C. - Lawyer, Former MP, CEO of Drew & Napier
 Steven Chong - Judge of Appeal

Education

 Tan Cheng Han, S.C. - Former Dean and Head, Faculty of Law, National University of Singapore
 Tan Chorh Chuan - Chief Health Scientist, Ministry of Health (MOH) and executive director of the new Office for Healthcare Transformation (from Jan 2018); Former President, National University of Singapore (NUS)

Religious Organisation

 Lawrence Khong - Senior Pastor of Faith Community Baptist Church

See also
 Former Saint Joseph's Institution
 Father Jean-Marie Beurel
 Catholic education in Singapore
SJI International

References

External links
 Official website
 Official School alumni website
 SJI International

Independent schools in Singapore
Lasallian schools in Singapore
Catholic schools in Singapore
Secondary schools in Singapore
Boys' schools in Singapore
Schools offering Integrated Programme in Singapore
 
Novena, Singapore
Educational institutions established in 1852
Junior colleges in Singapore
Schools in Central Region, Singapore
1852 establishments in the British Empire